The Holy Cross Inns Court Vicarage is in the Knowle West area of Bristol, England.

It was built in the 15th century. The surviving fragment, a stair turret, comes from what was once a much larger house, which was probably built for the lawyer Sir John Innys, who died in 1439.

The 15th century remains are designated by Historic England as a grade II* listed building. The stair turret is on the Buildings at Risk Register and described as being in fair condition, suffering slow decay.

See also
 Grade II* listed buildings in Bristol

References

External links

Houses completed in the 15th century
Grade II* listed buildings in Bristol
Structures on the Heritage at Risk register
Clergy houses in England
Houses in Bristol
Grade II* listed houses